The table below shows all results of Škoda Motorsport in World Rally Championship.

2L-MC era (1993–1997)

Octavia Kit Car era (1998)

WRC era (1999–2005)

Including points that Bruno Thiry gathered in 1999 season with different teams.
Škoda Motorsport didn't compete in 2004 season as manufacturer team.
Including points that Mikko Hirvonen scored in 2005 season with different teams.

Czech Rally Team Kopecký (2006–2007)

First Motorsport Škoda (2006–2007)

Red Bull Škoda (2006, 2009–2011)

Red Bull Škoda was run as Manufacturer team with WRC cars only in 2006 season. It returned for PWRC in 2009 and SWRC in 2010 and 2011 with Škoda Fabia S2000.

PWRC results

SWRC results

* WRC Cup for Super 2000 Teams championship

WRC2 era (2013, 2015–)

* Season still in progress.

Victories

PWRC Victories

{|class="wikitable" style="font-size: 95%; "
! No.
! Event
! Season
! Driver
! Co-driver
! Car
|-
|  style="text-align:right; padding-right:0.5em;"| 1
|  3rd Rally Norway
| rowspan="3" style="text-align:center;"| 2009
| rowspan="2"|  Patrik Sandell
| rowspan="2"|  Emil Axelsson
| rowspan="3"| Škoda Fabia S2000
|-
|  style="text-align:right; padding-right:0.5em;"| 2
|  2009 Cyprus Rally
|-
|  style="text-align:right; padding-right:0.5em;"| 3
|  2009 Acropolis Rally
|  Lambros Athanassoulas
|  Nikolaos Zakheos
|}

SWRC/WRC-2 Victories

{|class="wikitable" style="font-size: 95%; "
! No.
! Event
! Season
! Driver
! Co-driver
! Car
|-
| style="text-align:right; padding-right:0.5em;"| 1
|  58th Rally Sweden
| rowspan="5" style="text-align:center;"| 2010
|  Per-Gunnar Andersson
|  Anders Fredriksson
| rowspan="12"| Škoda Fabia S2000
|-
| style="text-align:right; padding-right:0.5em;"| 2
|  60th Neste Oil Rally Finland
|  Juho Hänninen
|  Mikko Markkula
|-
| style="text-align:right; padding-right:0.5em;"| 3
|  28. ADAC Rallye Deutschland
| rowspan="2"|  Patrik Sandell
| rowspan="2"|  Emil Axelsson
|-
| style="text-align:right; padding-right:0.5em;"| 4
|  2010 Rallye de France
|-
| style="text-align:right; padding-right:0.5em;"| 5
|  66th Wales Rally GB
|  Andreas Mikkelsen
|  Ola Floene
|-
| style="text-align:right; padding-right:0.5em;"| 6
|  57th Acropolis Rally
| rowspan="3" style="text-align:center;"| 2011
| rowspan="3"|  Juho Hänninen
| rowspan="3"|  Mikko Markkula
|-
| style="text-align:right; padding-right:0.5em;"| 7
|  61st Neste Oil Rally Finland
|-
| style="text-align:right; padding-right:0.5em;"| 8
|  47º RACC Rally de España
|-
| style="text-align:right; padding-right:0.5em;"| 9
|  46º Rally de Portugal
| rowspan="2" style="text-align:center;"| 2012
| rowspan="2"|  Hayden Paddon
| rowspan="2"|  John Kennard
|-
| style="text-align:right; padding-right:0.5em;"| 10
|  42nd Rally New Zealand
|-
| style="text-align:right; padding-right:0.5em;"| 11
|  81ème Rallye Automobile Monte-Carlo
| rowspan="2" style="text-align:center;"| 2013
|  Sepp Wiegand
|  Frank Christian
|-
| style="text-align:right; padding-right:0.5em;"| 12
|  47. Vodafone Rally de Portugal 2013
| rowspan="3"|  Esapekka Lappi
| rowspan="3"|  Janne Ferm
|-
|  style="text-align:right; padding-right:0.5em;"| 13
|  72nd Rally Poland 2015
| rowspan="5" style="text-align:center;"| 2015
| rowspan="4"| Škoda Fabia R5
|-
|  style="text-align:right; padding-right:0.5em;"| 14
|  65th Rally Finland 2015
|-
|  style="text-align:right; padding-right:0.5em;"| 15
|  33. Rallye Deutschland 2015
|  Jan Kopecký
|  Pavel Dresler
|-
| style="text-align:right; padding-right:0.5em;"| 16
|  51. RallyRACC Catalunya – Costa Daurada
|  Pontus Tidemand
|  Emil Axelsson
|-
| style="text-align:right; padding-right:0.5em;"| 17
|  71st Wales Rally GB
|  Teemu Suninen
|  Mikko Markkula
| Škoda Fabia S2000
|-
| style="text-align:right; padding-right:0.5em;"| 18
|  30º Rally México 2016
| rowspan="10" style="text-align:center;"| 2016
|  Teemu Suninen
|  Mikko Markkula
| rowspan="14"| Škoda Fabia R5
|-
| style="text-align:right; padding-right:0.5em;"| 19
|  36. Rally Argentina
|  Nicolás Fuchs
|  Fernando Mussano
|-
| style="text-align:right; padding-right:0.5em;"| 20
|  50º Rally de Portugal
|  Pontus Tidemand
|  Jonas Andersson
|-
| style="text-align:right; padding-right:0.5em;"| 21
|  13º Rally d'Italia Sardegna
|  Teemu Suninen
|  Mikko Markkula
|-
| style="text-align:right; padding-right:0.5em;"| 22
|  73rd Rally Poland
|  Teemu Suninen
|  Mikko Markkula
|-
| style="text-align:right; padding-right:0.5em;"| 23
|  66th Rally Finland 2016
|  Esapekka Lappi
|  Janne Ferm
|-
| style="text-align:right; padding-right:0.5em;"| 24
|  34 ADAC Rallye Deutschland 2016
|  Esapekka Lappi
|  Janne Ferm
|-
| style="text-align:right; padding-right:0.5em;"| 25
|  52. RallyRACC Catalunya – Costa Daurada 2016
|  Jan Kopecký
|  Pavel Dresler
|-
| style="text-align:right; padding-right:0.5em;"| 26
|  72nd Wales Rally GB 2016
|  Esapekka Lappi
|  Janne Ferm
|-
| style="text-align:right; padding-right:0.5em;"| 27
|  25th Rally Australia 2016
|  Esapekka Lappi
|  Janne Ferm
|-
| style="text-align:right; padding-right:0.5em;"| 28
|  85ème Rallye Automobile Monte-Carlo
| rowspan="4" style="text-align:center;" | 2017
|  Andreas Mikkelsen
|  Anders Jæger
|-
| style="text-align:right; padding-right:0.5em;"| 29
|  65th Rally Sweden
|  Pontus Tidemand
|  Jonas Andersson
|-
| style="text-align:right; padding-right:0.5em;"| 30
|  31º Rally México 2017
|  Pontus Tidemand
|  Jonas Andersson
|-
| style="text-align:right; padding-right:0.5em;"| 31
|  60. Che Guevara Energy Drink Tour de Corse 2017
|  Andreas Mikkelsen
|  Anders Jæger
|-
|}

Motorsport WRC results
World Rally Championship constructor results